Girlboss is an American comedy streaming television series created by Kay Cannon. The series was released on Netflix on April 21, 2017. The show was cancelled after one season.

Synopsis
The show is based on Sophia Amoruso's 2014 autobiography #Girlboss, which tells the story of how Amoruso started the company Nasty Gal while working as a campus safety host for San Francisco's Academy of Art University.

Cast

Main
Britt Robertson as Sophia Marlowe
Ellie Reed as Annie, Sophia's best friend
Johnny Simmons as Shane, Sophia's love interest
Alphonso McAuley as Dax, a bartender studying business and Annie's boyfriend

Recurring
Dean Norris as Jay Marlowe, Sophia's father
RuPaul Charles as Lionel, Sophia's neighbor
Melanie Lynskey as Gail, the owner of Rememberences and a vintage clothing seller
Jim Rash as Mobias, the owner of a consignment shop
 Cole Escola as Nathan
 Nicole Sullivan as Teresa
Louise Fletcher as Rosie, a bitter old lady
Norm Macdonald as Rick, Sophia's best and last boss
 Amanda Rea as Bettina
Macedo (Michelle and Melissa) as members of Shane's band
 Alice Ripley as Kathleen, Sophia's mom

Production
In February 2016, it was announced that Netflix had ordered a series based on Amoruso's autobiography #Girlboss. It was announced that the first season received an order of 13 episodes. In June 2016, Britt Robertson joined the cast of the series. That same month, Johnny Simmons, Alphonso McAuley and Ellie Reed joined the cast. In July 2016, Dean Norris joined the cast in a recurring role.

Principal photography took place in San Francisco and Los Angeles.

Episodes

Reception
Review aggregator Rotten Tomatoes gives the first season a 32 percent rating based on 25 reviews and an average rating of 5.94/10. Metacritic gives the series a score of 53 out of 100, based on 13 critics, indicating "mixed or average reviews".

Some critics criticized the main character's unlikeability, but praised Robertson's portrayal.

Critics were divided as to whether the show presented a feminist message. Jennifer Wright from New York Post called the show a "feminist fraud" because of Sophia's selfishness. On April 18, 2018, Zimbio criticized the show saying it was "like the weird forgotten cousin of Degrassi".

References

External links
 Girlboss on Netflix
 

2010s American workplace comedy television series
2017 American television series debuts
2017 American television series endings
Fashion-themed television series
English-language Netflix original programming
Television shows based on American novels
Television series based on actual events
Television series set in 2006
Television series set in 2008
Television shows filmed in Los Angeles
Television shows set in San Francisco